The Adelaide meeting house of the Religious Society of Friends ("Quakers") is situated on Pennington Terrace, North Adelaide, South Australia, literally in the shadow of St Peter's Cathedral, on its west side. It is substantially made of timber, the only such church building in the City. Besides Sunday meetings, weddings and the like, it has also hosted secular meetings, particularly for peace, education, temperance and other social causes. It also served briefly for Adelaide's Presbyterian congregation prior to construction of the Church of Scotland building on Grenfell Street, also for the North Adelaide congregation of the Church of England.

The land on which it stands was donated to the Society of Friends by church member J. Barton Hack. He also had the contract for construction of the prefabricated building, supplied by Henry Manning of London, around 1840. (The rectory of Trinity Church, Adelaide was also a "Manning's portable cottage".)

Despite a prohibition on churchyard burials in the City of Adelaide, there were around seventeen graves in its tiny yard, including that of J. B. Hack's child. and a son and first wife of Joseph Barritt. From 1858 no further burials took place there, as a separate area had been reserved for Quakers at the West Terrace Cemetery.

The meeting house significantly predates St. Peter's Cathedral, the land for which was purchased in 1862 and the foundation stone laid in 1869. A condition of the land sale was provision of a right of way to the meeting house.

On 28 May 1981, the building was listed on the South Australian Heritage Register.

References

Further reading
Goldney, F. H. The Quaker Meeting House, North Adelaide, Pioneers Association of South Australia, 1968
SA Memory > Buildings: Quaker (Religious Society of Friends) Meeting House 
History SA > About Time > Visit Adelaide's Quaker Meeting House 
Quakers in South Australia > Meetings for worship > Adelaide local meeting 
Channel 9 South Australia Pty Ltd > Postcards > Friend's Meeting House

Religious buildings and structures in Adelaide
1840 establishments in Australia
History of Adelaide
Quakerism in Australia
19th-century Quaker meeting houses
North Adelaide
South Australian Heritage Register